Hamgyongnamdo Sports Clubb is a North Korean football club. The club is a representative side of South Hamgyong Province, playing in various national competitions. The 20,000 capacity Hamhung City People's Stadium is the home stadium of South Hamgyŏng SC.

Football clubs in North Korea